Pseudoeurycea lineola, commonly known as the Veracruz worm salamander or Mexican slender salamander, is a species of salamander in the family Plethodontidae. Molecular evidence suggests that it consists of two distinct species. It was the type species of genus Lineatriton.

Description
Males measure  and females  in snout–vent length. The males have white (unpigemented) testes and vasa deferentia.

Habitat and conservation
Natural habitats of Pseudoeurycea lineola are pine-oak forests, but it can also survive in shaded coffee plantations. It is a terrestrial species found beneath stones, logs and other debris, and in subterranean situations. The species is threatened by habitat loss caused by expanding agriculture and human settlements and by wood extraction. It is an uncommon species that is difficult to find.

References

lineola
Amphibians described in 1865
Endemic amphibians of Mexico
Fauna of the Trans-Mexican Volcanic Belt
Taxonomy articles created by Polbot